The Fourteenth Ordinary General Assembly of the Synod of Bishops will contain "a great part of the episcopate," with many participating bishops being elected by their peers.  The Synod fathers include

List Of Synod Fathers according to role

From the Eastern Catholic Churches

Synod of the Coptic Catholic Church

ex officio:
Patriarch Ibrahim Isaac Sidrak, Patriarch of Alexandria of the Copts, Head of the Synod of the Coptic Catholic Church.

Synod of the Greek-Melkite Catholic

ex officio:
Patriarch Gregory III Laham, B.S., Patriarch of Antioch of the Greek-Melkites, Head of the Synod of the Greek-Melkite Catholic.

ex electione:
Archbishop George Bacouni, Archbishop of Akka, Acre, Ptolemais of the Greek-Melkites.

Synod of the Syriac Catholic Church

ex officio:
Patriarch Ignatius Joseph III Yonan, Patriarch of Antioch of the Syrians, Head of the Synod of the Syriac Catholic Church.

Synod of the Maronite Church

ex officio:
Patriarch Bechara Boutros al-Rahi, OMM, Patriarch of Antioch of the Maronites, Head of the Synod of the Maronite Church.

ex electione:
Bishop Antoine Nabil Andari, Titular Bishop of Tarsus of the Maronites, Auxiliary and Syncellus of Joubbé, Sarba and Jounieh of the Maronites, President of the Episcopal Commission for the Family and Life.

Bishop Antoine Tarabay, OLM, Bishop of Saint Maron of Sydney of the Maronites.

Synod of the Chaldean Church

ex officio:
Patriarch Louis Raphael I Sako, Patriarch of Babylon of the Chaldeans, Head of the Synod of the Chaldean Church.

Synod of the Armenian Catholic Church

ex officio:
Patriarch Krikor Bedros XX Gabroyan, Patriarch of Cilicia of the Armenians, Head of the Synod of the Armenian Catholic Church.

Synod of the Ukrainian Greek Catholic Church

ex officio:
Major Archbishop Sviatoslav Shevchuk, Major Archbishop of Kyiv-Haly, Head of the Synod of the Ukrainian Greek Catholic Church.

ex electione:
Bishop Hlib Lonchyna, Bishop of the Holy Family of London the Ukrainians Byzantines.

Bishop Borys Gudziak, Bishop of Saint Vladimir-Le-Grand de Paris of the Ukrainians Byzantines.

Synod of the Syro-Malabar

ex officio:
Cardinal, Major Archbishop George Alencherry, Major Archbishop of Ernakulam-Angamaly of the Syro-Malabar, President of the Synod of the Syro-Malabar Church.

ex electione:
Bishop Joseph Kallarangatt, Bishop of Palai of the Syro-Malabar.

Archbishop Andrews Thazhath, Archbishop of Trichur of Syro-Malabar.

Synod of the Syro-Malankara

ex officio:
Cardinal, Major Archbishop Baselios Cleemis, Major Archbishop of Trivandrum of the Syro-Malankars, Head of the Synod of the Syro-Malankara.

Synod of the Romanian Church

ex officio:
Bishop Mihai Frățilă, Bishop of St. Basil the Great in Bucharest of the Romanians.

Council of the Ethiopian Church

ex officio:
Cardinal, Archbishop Berhaneyesus Demerew Souraphiel, CM, President of the Episcopal Conference, Archbishop of Addis Ababa, President of the Council of the Ethiopian Church.

Council of the Ruthenian Church, U.S.A.

ex officio:
Archbishop William C. Skurla, Metropolitan Archbishop of Pittsburgh of Byzantines, President of the Council of the Ruthenian Church.

Church Council Slovak

ex officio:
Archbishop Ján Babjak, SI, Metropolitan Archbishop of Presov for Catholics of Byzantine Rite, President of Council of Slovakia Church.

Church Council Eritrea

ex officio:
Archbishop Menghesteab Tesfamariam MCCJ, Metropolitan Archbishop of Asmara, President of the Council of the Church Eritrea.

Council of the Hungarian Church

ex officio:
Archbishop Péter Fülöp Kocsis, Metropolitan Archbishop of Hajdúdorog for Catholics of Byzantine Rite, President of Council of the Hungarian Church.

Elected by Episcopal Conferences

Africa

North Africa (C.E.R.N.A.)

Member:Bishop Jean-Paul Vesco, OP, Bishop of Oran (Algeria)

Angola and Sao Tome

Member: Bishop Emilio Sumbelelo, Bishop of Uíje (Angola)

Benin

Member: Bishop Eugène Cyrille Houndékon, Bishop of Abomey, Vice President of the Episcopal Conference

Botswana, South Africa And Swaziland

Members: Archbishop Stephen Brislin, Archbishop of Cape Town, Kaapstad, President of the Episcopal Conference (South Africa)

Bishop Zolile Peter Mpambani, SCI, Bishop of Kokstad (South Africa)

Burkina Faso And Niger

Member: Bishop Joseph Sama, Bishop of Nouna (Burkina Faso)

Burundi

Member: Bishop Gervais Bashimiyubusa, of Ngozi, president of the Episcopal Conference.

Substitute: Bishop Joachim Ntahondereye of Muyinga.

Cameroon

Members: ArchbishopJoseph Atanga, SI, Archbishop of Bertoua

ArchbishopSamuel Kleda, Archbishop of Douala, President of the Episcopal Conference

Central African Republic

Member: Bishop Cyr-Nestor Yapaupa, Bishop of Alindao

Chad

Member: Bishop Henri Coudray, SI, Titular Bishop of Silli, Apostolic Vicar of Mongo

Congo (Rep. of)

Member: Bishop Urbain Ngassongo, Bishop of Gamboma, President of the Episcopal Commission for Family Ministry

Congo (Democratic Rep. of)

Members: Bishop Nicolas Djomo Lola, Bishop of Tshumbe

Bishop Philibert Tembo Nlandu, CICM, Bishop of Budjala

Ethiopia and Eritrea

Member: Bishop Tsegaye Keneni Derera, apostolic vicar of Soddo, Ethiopia.

Substitute: Bishop Markos Gebremedhin, C.M.,  apostolic vicar of Jimma-Bonga, Ethiopia.

Gabon

Member: Bishop Mathieu Madega Lebouakehan, Bishop of Mouila, President of the Episcopal Conference

Gambia and Sierra Leone

Member: Bishop Charles Allieu Matthew Campbell, Bishop of Bo (Sierra Leone)

Ghana

Member: Archbishop Charles Gabriel Palmer- Buckle, of Accra.

Substitute: Bishop Anthony Kwami Adanuty of Keta-katsi.

Guinea

Member: Bishop Raphael Balla Guilavogui, Bishop of N'Zérékoré

Equatorial Guinea

Member: Bishop  Juan Matogo Oyana, CMF, Bishop of Bata3

Indian Ocean (C.E.D.O.I.)

Member: Bishop Maurice Piat CSSp., Bishop of Port-Louis (Mauritius), President of the Episcopal Conference

Ivory Coast

Member: Bishop Ignace Bessi Dogb, Bishop of Katiola, President of the Episcopal Commission Nationale de l'Apostolat des laïcs

Kenya

Members: Cardinal John Njue, Archbishop of Nairobi, president of the Episcopal Conference.

Bishop James Maria Wainaina Kungu of Muranga.

Substitute: Bishop Emanuel Barbara, O.F.M. Cap. of Malindi.

Lesotho

Member: Archbishop Gerard Tlali Lerotholi, OMI, Archbishop of Maseru, President of the Episcopal Conference

Liberia

Member:Bishop Anthony Fallah Borwah, Bishop of Gbarnga

Madagascar

Member: Bishop Desire Tsarahazana of Toamasina, president of the Episcopal Conference.

Substitute: Bishop Jean de Dieu Raoelison, auxiliary of Antananarivo.MALAWI

Malawi

Member: Archbishop Thomas Luke Msusa, SMM, Archbishop of Blantyre, President of the Episcopal Conference

Mali

Member: Bishop Jonas Dembele, Bishop of Kayes

Mozambique

Member: Archbishop Francisco Chimoio, O.F.M. Cap., Archbishop of Maputo, President of the Episcopal Commission for the Family

Namibia

Member: Bishop Phillip Pöllitzer, OMI, Bishop of Keetmanshoop

Nigeria

Members: Archbishop Matthew Man-oso Ndagoso, Archbishop of Kaduna

Bishop Camillus Archibong Etokudoh Umoh, Bishop of Ikot Ekpene

Bishop Jude Ayodeji Arogundade, Bishop of Ondo

Rwanda

Member: Bishop Antoine Kambanda of Kibungo.

Substitute: Bishop Smaragde Mbonyintege of Kabgayi, president of the Episcopal Conference.

Senegal, Mauritania, Capo Verde and Guinea-Bissau

Member: Archbishop Benjamin Ndiaye, Archbishop of Dakar (Senegal), President of the Episcopal Conference

Sudan

Member: Archbishop Paulino Lukudu Loro MCCJ, Archbishop of Juba

Tanzania

Members: Bishop Tarcisius Ngalalekumtwa, Bishop of Iringa, President of the Episcopal Conference

Bishop Renatus Leonard Nkwande, Bishop of Bunda

Togo

Member: Bishop Jacques Danga Longa, Bishop of Kara

Uganda

Members: Archbishop John Baptist Odama, Archbishop of Gulu, President of the Episcopal Conference

Bishop Joseph Anthony Zziwa, Bishop of Kiyinda-Mityana, Vice President of the Episcopal Conference

Zambia

Member: Bishop Benjamin S. Phiri, Titular Bishop of Nachingwea, Auxiliary of Chipata

Zimbabwe

Member: Bishop Xavier Munyongani Xavier Johnsai MUNYONGANI, Bishop of Gweru

Americas

Argentina

Members: Bishop Pedro María Laxague, auxiliary of Bahia Blanca.

Archbishop Jose Maria Arancedo of Santa Fe de la Vera Cruz, president of the Episcopal Conference.

Cardinal Mario Aurelio Poli, archbishop of Buenos Aires.

Substitutes: Archbishop Andres Stanovnik, O.F.M. Cap. of Corrientes.

Archbishop Hector Ruben Aguer of La Plata.
BOLIVIA

His Ecc.za Rev.ma Mgr. Braulio SÁEZ García, OCD, Titular Bishop of Satin, auxiliary of Santa Cruz de la Sierra

His Ecc.za Rev.ma Mons. Krzysztof Janusz BIAASIK WAWROWSKA, SVD, Bishop of Oruro

Brazil

Members: Archbishop Sérgio da Rocha, Archbishop of Brasilia, President of the Episcopal Conference

Bishop João Carlos Petrini, Bishop of Camaçari

Archbishop Geraldo Lyrio Rocha, Archbishop of Mariana

Cardinal Archbishop Odilo Pedro Scherer, Archbishop of São Paulo

Canada

Members: Archbishop Paul-André Durocher, Archbishop of Gatineau, President of the Episcopal Conference

Bishop Noël Simard, Bishop of Valleyfield

Archbishop Thomas Christopher Collins, Archbishop of Toronto

Archbishop Richard William Smith, Archbishop of Edmonton

Chile

Members: Bishop Bernardo Miguel Bastres Florence, S.D.B. of Punta Arenas.

Cardinal Ricardo Ezzati Andrello, S.D.B., archbishop of Santiago de Chile, president of the Episcopal Conference.

Substitute: Bishop Cristian Contreras Villarroel of Melipilla, general secretary of the Episcopal Conference.

Colombia

Members: Bishop Pablo Emir Salas Anteliz, Bishop of Armenia

Cardinal Archbishop Rubén Salazar Gómez, Archbishop of Bogota, President of the Latin American Episcopal Council (CELAM.)

Archbishop Oscar Urbina Ortega, Archbishop of Villavicencio

Costa Rica

Member: Bishop José Francisco Ulloa Rojas, Bishop of Cartago, President of the Episcopal Comisión para la Pastoral Familiar

Cuba

Member: Bishop Marcelo Arturo Gonzalez Amador of Santa Clara.

Dominican Republic

Member: Bishop Gregorio Nicanor Peña Rodríguez, Bishop of Nuestra Señora de la Altagracia en Higüey, President of the Episcopal Conference

Ecuador

Members: Archbishop Antonio Arregui Yarza of Guayaquil.

Archbishop Luis Gerardo Cabrera Herrera, O.F.M. of Cuenca.

Substitutes: Bishop Julio Parrilla Diaz of Riobamba.

Bishop Marcos Aurelio Perez Caicedo of Babahoyo, vice president of the Episcopal Conference.

El Salvador

Member: Bishop Constantino Barrera Morales, Bishop of Sonsonate

Guatemala

Member: Bishop Rodolfo Valenzuela Núñez, Bishop of Vera Paz, Coban, President of the Episcopal Conference

Haiti

Member: Bishop Yves-Marie Péan, CSC, Bishop of Gonaïves

Honduras

Member: Bishop Luis Sole Fa, C.M. of Trujillo.

Substitute: Bishop Angel Garachana Perez, C.M.F. of San Pedro Sula.

Mexico

Members: Bishop Rodrigo Aguilar Martinez of Tehuacan.

Cardinal Norberto Rivera Carrera, archbishop of Mexico.

Bishop Alfonso Gerardo Miranda Guardiola, auxiliary of Monterrey.

Cardinal Francisco Robles Ortega, archbishop of Guadalajara, president of the Episcopal Conference.

Substitutes: Bishop Jose Francisco Gonzalez Gonzalez of Campeche.

Nicaragua

Member: Bishop César Bosco Vivas Robelo, Bishop of León en Nicaragua

Panama

Member: Bishop Aníbal Saldaña Santamaría, OAR, Bishop Prelate of Bocas del Toro

Paraguay

Member: Bishop Miguel Ángel Cabello Almada, Bishop of Concepción en Paraguay

Peru

Member: Archbishop Salvador Piñeiro, Archbishop of Ayacucho or Huamanga, President of the Episcopal Conference

Archbishop Héctor Miguel Cabrejos Vidarte, OFM, Archbishop of Trujillo

Puerto Rico

Member: Archbishop Roberto González Nieves, OFM, Archbishop of San Juan de Puerto Rico, President of the Episcopal Conference

United States

Members: Archbishop Joseph Edward Kurtz of Louisville, president of the Episcopal Conference.

Archbishop Charles Joseph Chaput, O.F.M. Cap. of Philadelphia.

Cardinal Daniel N. Di Nardo, archbishop of Galveston-Houston, vice president of the Episcopal Conference.

Archbishop José Horacio Gómez of Los Angeles.

Substitutes: Archbishop Blase J. Cupich of Chicago.

Archbishop Salvatore Joseph Cordileone of San Francisco.

Uruguay

Member: Bishop Jaime Rafael Fuentes Martin of  Minas.

Substitute:Bishop Rodolfo Pedro Wirz Kraemer of Maldonado-Punta del Este, president of the Episcopal Conference.

Venezuela

Members: Cardinal Archbishop Jorge Urosa, Archbishop of Caracas, Santiago de Venezuela

Archbishop Diego Padrón, Archbishop of Cumana, President of the Episcopal Conference

West Indies

Member: Bishop Francis Dean Alleyne OSB, Bishop of Georgetown

Asia

Arab Countries

Member: Patriarch Fouad Twal, Patriarch of Jerusalem of the Latins (Jerusalem), President of the Episcopal Conference

Bangladesh

Member: Bishop Paul Ponen Kubi, CSC, Bishop of Mymensingh, President of the Episcopal Family Life Commission

Cambodia and Laos

Member: Bishop Louis-Marie Ling Mangkhanekhoun, Titular Bishop of Acque new Proconsulari, Apostolic Vicar of Pakse (Laos)

China

Member: Bishop John Baptist Lee Keh-mien, Bishop of Hsinchu

East Timor

Member: Bishop Basilio do Nascimento, Bishop of Baucau, President of the Episcopal Conference

India (C.C.B.I.)

Members: Cardinal Archbishop Oswald Gracias, Archbishop of Bombay, President of the Episcopal Conference

Patriarch Filipe Neri Ferrão, Archbishop of Goa and Damao and Patriarch of the East Indies

Bishop Selvister Ponnumuthan, Bishop of Punalur

Archbishop Dominic Jala, SDB, Archbishop of Shillong

Indonesia

Members: Archbishop Ignatius Suharyo Hardjoatmodjo, Archbishop of Jakarta, President of the Episcopal Conference

Bishop Franciscus Kopong Kung, Bishop of Larantuka

Iran

Member: Ramzi Garmou, Archbishop of Tehran of the Chaldeans, Patriarchal Administrator of Ahwaz the Chaldeans, President of the Episcopal Conference

Japan

Member: Archbishop Joseph Mitsuaki Takami, PSS, Archbishop of Nagasaki, Vice President of the Episcopal Conference

Korea

Member: Bishop Peter Woo-il Kang, Bishop of Cheju

Kazakhstan

Member: Archbishop Tomasz Peta, Archbishop of Maria Santissima in Astana, President of the Episcopal Conference

Malaysia – Singapore – Brunei

Member: Archbishop John Wong Soo Kau, Archbishop of Kota Kinabalu (Malaysia)

Myanmar

Member: Cardinal Archbishop Charles Maung Bo, SDB, Archbishop of Yangon

Pakistan

Member: Bishop Joseph Arshad of Faisalabad.

Substitute: Archbishop Sebastian Francis Shaw of Lahore.

Philippines

Members: Archbishop Romulo Valles, Archbishop of Davao

Archbishop Jose Serofia Palma, Archbishop of Cebu

Bishop Gilbert A. Garcera, Bishop of Daet

Sri Lanka

Member: Bishop Harold Anthony Perera, Bishop of Kurunegala

Thailand

Member: Bishop Silvio Siripong Charatsri, Bishop of Chanthaburi

Vietnam

Members: Archbishop Paul Bui Van Doc of Thanh-Pho Ho Chi Minh, Hochiminh Ville, president of the Episcopal Conference.

Bishop Joseph Dinh Duc Dao, auxiliary of Xuan Loc.

Substitute: Bishop Pierre Nguyen Van Kham of My Tho.

Europe

Albania

Member: Bishop George Frendo, O.P. Auxiliary of Tirane-Durrës.

Substitute: Bishop Ottavio Vitale, R.C.J. of Lezhe, Lesh.

Austria

Member: Bishop Benno Elbs of Feldkirch.

Substitute: Bishop Kalus Kung of Sankt Polten.

Belarus

Member: Archbishop Tadeusz Kondrusiewicz of Minsk-Mohilev, President of the Episcopal Conference

Belgium

Member: Bishop Johan Bonny, Bishop of Antwerp, Antwerp

Bosnia and Herzegovina

Member: Bishop Tomo Vuksic, military ordinary of Bosnia and Herzegovina.

Substitute: Bishop Marko Semren, O.F.M. auxiliary of Banja Luka.

Bulgaria

Member: Bishop Gheorghi Ivanov Jovcev, Bishop of Sofia and Plovdiv

Croatia

Member: Bishop Antun Škvorčević, Bishop of Požega

Czech Republic

Member: Bishop Jan Vokál, Bishop of Hradec Kralove

Episcopal Conference of the International SS. Cyril and Methodius

Member: Bishop László Német, SVD, Bishop of Zrenjanin (Serbia)

France

Members: Archbishop Georges Pontier of Marseille, president of the Episcopal Conference.

Cardinal Andre Vingt-Trois, archbishop Paris.

Bishop Jean-Luc Brunin of Le Havre.

Bishop Jean-Paul James of Nantes.

Substitutes: Bishop Olivier de Germay of Ajaccio.

Bishop Bruno Feillet, auxiliary of Reims.

Germany

Members: Cardinal Archbishop Reinhard Marx, Archbishop of Munich and Freising

Archbishop Heiner Koch, Archbishop of Berlin

Bishop Franz-Josef Hermann Bode, Bishop of Osnabrück

Greece

Member: Bishop Fragkiskos Papamanolis, O.F.M. Cap. emeritus of Syros, president of the Episcopal Conference.

Substitute: Archbishop Nikolaos Foskolos, emeritus of Athenai.

Hungary

Bishop András Veres, Bishop of Szombathely

Ireland

Members: Archbishop Diarmuid Martin of Dublin.

Archbishop Eamon Martin of Armagh, president of the Episcopal Conference.

Substitute: Archbishop Kieran O'Reilly, S.M.A. of Cashel.

Italy

Members: Cardinal Archbishop Angelo Bagnasco, Archbishop of Genoa, President of the Episcopal Conference

Cardinal Archbishop Angelo Scola, Archbishop of Milan

Bishop Franco Giulio Brambilla, Bishop of Novara

Bishop Enrico Solmi, Bishop of Parma

Latvia

Member: Archbishop Zbigņevs Stankevičs, Archbishop of Riga

Lithuania

Member: Cardinal Audrys Jouzas Backis, archbishop emeritus of Vilnius.

Substitute: Bishop Rimantas Norvila of Vilkaviskis.

Malta

Member: Bishop Mario Grech, Bishop of Gozo, President of the Episcopal Conference

Netherlands

Member: Cardinal Willem Jacobus Eijk, archbishop of Utrecht.

Substitute: Bishop Johannes Wilhelmus Maria Liesen of Breda.

Poland

Members: Archbishop Stanisław Gądecki, Archbishop of Poznan, President of the Episcopal Conference

Archbishop Henryk Hoser, SAC, Archbishop-Bishop of Warsaw-Prague

Bishop Jan Franciszek Wątroba, Bishop of Rzeszów

Portugal

Members: Cardinal Patriarch Manuel Clemente, Patriarch of Lisbon, President of the Episcopal Conference

Bishop Antonino Eugénio Fernandes Dias, Bishop of Portalegre-Castelo Branco, President of the Episcopal Comissão do Laicado and Família

Romania

Member: Bishop Petru Gherghel, Bishop of Iași

Russian Federation

Member: Archbishop Paolo Pezzi, FSCB, Archbishop of Mother of God in Moscow, President of the Episcopal Conference

Scandinavia

Member: Bishop Teemu Sippo, SCI, Bishop of Helsinki

Slovakia

Member: Archbishop Stanislav Zvolenský, Archbishop of Bratislava, President of the Episcopal Conference

Slovenia

Member: Archbishop Stane Zore, OFM, Archbishop of Ljubljana

Spain

Members: Cardinal Ricardo Blazquez Perez, archbishop of Valladolid, president of the Episcopal Conference.

Bishop Mario Iceta Gavicagogeascoa of Bilbao.

Archbishop Carlos Osoro Sierra of Madrid.

Substitute: Bishop Juan Antonio Reig Pla of Alcala de Henares.

Switzerland

Member: Bishop Jean-Marie Lovey, CRB, Bishop of Sion

Turkey

Member: Archbishop Lévon Boghos Zékiyan, Archbishop of Istanbul

Ukraine

Member: Archbishop Mieczysław Mokrzycki, Archbishop of Lviv of the Latins, President of the Episcopal Conference

United Kingdom

England and Wales

Members: Cardinal Vincent Gerard Nichols, archbishop of Westminster, president of the Episcopal Conference.

Bishop Peter John Haworth Doyle of Northampton.

Substitute: Bishop Philip Anthony Egan of Portsmouth.

Scotland

Member: Archbishop Philip Tartaglia, Archbishop of Glasgow, President of the Episcopal Conference

Oceania

Australia

Members: Bishop Daniel Eugene Hurley of Darwin.

Archbishop Mark Benedict Coleridge of Brisbane.

Substitute: Archbishop Philip Edward Wilson of Adelaide.

New Zealand

Member: Bishop Charles Edward Drennan of Palmerston North.

Substitute: Cardinal John Dew, archbishop of Wellington, president of the Episcopal Conference.

Pacific (CEPAC)

Member: Archbishop Peter Loy Chong, Archbishop of Suva

Papua New Guinea and Solomon Islands

Member: Bishop Anton Bal, Bishop of Kundiawa, the Independent Commission for Family Life

Elected representatives of the Union of Superiors General
Members: 
Rev. Father Adolfo Nicolás Pachon, superior general of the Jesuits

Rev. Fr. Marco Tasca, O.F.M. Conv., Minister General of the Franciscan Friars Minor Conventual

Rev. Fr. Mario Aldegani, CSI, Superior General of the Josephites of Murialdo

Rev. Richard P. Kuuia Baawobr, M.Afr., Superior General of the White Fathers

Rev. Fr. Bruno Cadoré, OP, Master General of the Dominicans

Rev. Jesús Díaz Alonso, SF, Superior General of the Sons of the Holy Family of Jesus, Mary and Joseph

Rev. Father Michael Brehl, C.SS.R., Superior General of the Redemptorists

Rev. Javier Alvarez-Ossorio, SS.CC., superior general of the Picpus Fathers

Rev. Ab. Jeremias Schröder OSB, Archabbot President of the Congregation of Sant'Ottilia

Fr. Hervé Janson, PFJ, Prior General of the Little Brothers of Jesus (Foucauld)

Heads of the Dicasteries of the Roman Curia

Cardinal Pietro Parolin, Secretary of State

Cardinal Gerhard Ludwig Müller, Prefect of the Congregation for the Doctrine of the Faith

Cardinal Leonardo Sandri, Prefect of the Congregation for Oriental Churches

Cardinal Robert Sarah, Prefect of the Congregation for Divine Worship and the Discipline of the Sacraments

Cardinal Angelo Amato, SDB, Prefect of the Congregation for the Causes of Saints

Cardinal Marc Ouellet, PSS, prefect of the Congregation for Bishops

Cardinal Fernando Filoni, Prefect of the Congregation for the Evangelization of Peoples

Cardinal Beniamino Stella, Prefect of the Congregation for the Clergy

Cardinal João Braz de Aviz, Prefect of the Congregation for Institutes of Consecrated Life and Societies of Apostolic Life

Cardinal Giuseppe Versaldi, Prefect of the Congregation for Catholic Education

Cardinal Mauro Piacenza, Major Penitentiary of the Apostolic Penitentiary

Cardinal Dominique Mamberti, Prefect of the Supreme Tribunal of the Apostolic Signatura

Cardinal Stanisław Ryłko, President of the Pontifical Council for the Laity

Cardinal  Kurt Koch, President of the Pontifical Council for Promoting Christian Unity

Archbishop Emeritus Vincenzo Paglia, Archbishop-Bishop Emeritus of Terni-Narni-Amelia, president of the Pontifical Council for the Family

Cardinal Peter Kodwo Appiah Turkson, President of the Pontifical Council for Justice and Peace

Cardinal Antonio Maria Vegliò, president of the Pontifical Council for the Pastoral Care of Migrants and Itinerant People

Archbishop Emeritus Zygmunt Zimowski, Archbishop-Bishop Emeritus of Radom, President of the Pontifical Council for Health Care Workers

Cardinal Francesco Coccopalmerio, president of the Pontifical Council for Legislative Texts

Cardinal Jean-Louis Tauran, President of the Pontifical Council for Interreligious Dialogue and the Camerlengo of the Holy Roman Church

Cardinal Gianfranco Ravasi, president of the Pontifical Council for Culture

Archbishop Emeritus Claudio Maria Celli, Titular Archbishop of Civitanova, President of the Pontifical Council for Social Communications

Archbishop Emeritus Salvatore Fisichella, Titular Archbishop of Voghenza, President of the Pontifical Council for Promoting the New Evangelization

Cardinal George Pell, Prefect of the Secretariat for the Economy

Cardinal Domenico Calcagno, President of the Administration of the Patrimony of the Apostolic See

Pontifical appointments

Cardinal Angelo Sodano, Dean of the College of Cardinals

Cardinal  Godfried Danneels, archbishop emeritus of Mechelen-Brussel (Belgium).

Cardinal Dionigi Tettamanzi, archbishop emeritus of Milan (Italy).

Cardinal Christoph Schönborn OP, archbishop of Vienna, President of the Episcopal Conference (Austria).

Cardinal Walter Kasper, president emeritus of the Pontifical Council for Promoting Christian Unity (Vatican City).

Cardinal Wilfrid Fox Napier, OFM, Archbishop of Durban (South Africa).

Cardinal Óscar Andrés Rodríguez Maradiaga, SDB, Archbishop of Tegucigalpa, President of the Episcopal Conference (Honduras).

Cardinal Péter Erdő, Archbishop of Esztergom-Budapest, President of the Episcopal Conference, President of the Council for European Episcopals Conferences (CCEE) (Hungary).

Cardinal Carlo Caffarra, Archbishop of Bologna (Italy).

Cardinal Lluís Martínez Sistach, Archbishop of Barcelona (Spain).

Cardinal Laurent Monsengwo Pasinya, Archbishop of Kinshasa (Democratic Rep. Of Congo).

Cardinal Donald Wuerl, Archbishop of Washington (USA).

Cardinal Raymundo Damasceno Assis, Archbishop of Aparecida (Brazil).

Cardinal Timothy Michael Dolan, Archbishop of New York (USA).

Cardinal Luis Antonio Tagle, Archbishop of Manila (Philippines).

Cardinal Gérald Lacroix, Archbishop of Quebec (Canada).

Cardinal Gualtiero Bassetti, Archbishop of Perugia-Città della Pieve (Italy).

Cardinal Philippe Ouédraogo, Archbishop of Ouagadougou (Burkina Faso).

Cardinal John Dew, Archbishop of Wellington, President of the Episcopal Conference (New Zealand).

Cardinal Edoardo Menichelli, Archbishop of Ancona-Osimo (Italy).

Cardinal Alberto Suárez Inda, Archbishop of Morelia (Mexico).

Cardinal Francesco Montenegro, Archbishop of Agrigento (Italy).

Cardinal Daniel Sturla SDB, Archbishop of Montevideo (Uruguay).

Cardinal José Luis Lacunza Maestrojuán, OAR, Bishop David, President of the Episcopal Conference (Panama).

Cardinal Soane Patita Paini Mafi, Bishop of Tonga, President of the Episcopal Conference (Tonga).

Cardinal Elio Sgreccia, president emeritus of the Pontifical Academy for Life (Italy).

Cardinal Giuseppe Bertello, President of the Governorate of Vatican City (Vatican City).

Archbishop Baltazar Enrique Porras Cardozo, Archbishop of Mérida (Venezuela).

Archbishop. Yannis Spiteris, O.F.M. Cap., Archbishop of Corfu, Zakynthos and Kefalonia (Greece).

Archbishop Bruno Forte, Archbishop of Chieti-Vasto (Italy).

Archbishop Laurent Ulrich, Archbishop of Lille (France).

Archbishop Carlos Aguiar Retes, Archbishop of Tlalnepantla (Mexico).

Archbishop Sergio Eduardo Castriani CSSp., Archbishop of Manaus (Brazil).

Archbishop Víctor Manuel Fernández, Titular Archbishop of Tiburnia, Rector of the Pontifical Catholic University of Argentina (Argentina).

Archbishop Blase J. Cupich, Archbishop of Chicago (USA).

Bishop George Vance Murry, S.J., Bishop of Youngstown (United States).

Bishop. Marcello Semeraro, Bishop of Albano (Italy).

Bishop Alonso Gerardo Garza Treviño, Bishop of Piedras Negras (Mexico).

Bishop Lucas Van Looy, SDB, Bishop of Ghent, (Belgium).

Msgr. Pio Vito Pinto, Dean of the Tribunal of the Roman Rota (Vatican City).

Msgr Saulo Scarabattoli, pastor of Holy Spirit Parish in Port Eburnea, Perugia (Italy).

Msgr. Roberto Rosa, parish priest of St. James the Apostle, Trieste (Italy).

Fr. François-Xavier Dumortier, S.J., rector of the Pontifical Gregorian University in Rome (Italy).

Fr. Antonio Spadaro S.J.,  director of the journal La Civilta Cattolica (Italy).

Fr. Manuel Jesúìus Arroba Conde, CMF, Dean of the Faculty of utrusque jure of the Pontifical Lateran University (Spain).

Undersecretary of the Synod of Bishops

Member: 
Bishop Fabio Fabene, Titular Bishop of Aquipendium (Vatican City)

List of other participants according to title of participation

Collaborators with the Special Secretary

Members: 
Fr. Matías Auge Benet, C.M.F., Consultor of the Congregation for Divine Worship and the Discipline of the Sacraments, (Spain)

Professor Giacomo Bertolini, associate professor of canon and ecclesiastical law at the University of Padua, Treviso Section; visiting professor at the Pontifical Urban University in Rome, (Italy)

Fr. Giuseppe Bonfrate, lecturer at the Faculty of Theology of the Pontifical Gregorian University in Rome, (Italy)

Msgr. Philippe Bordeyne, rector of the Institut Catholique de Paris, (France)

Msgr. Lluis Clavell, ordinary member of the Pontifical Academy of St. Thomas Aquinas, (Spain)

Msgr. Duarte Nuno Queiroz De Barros Da Cunha, secretary general of the Consilium Conferentiarum Episcoporum Europae (C.C.E.E.), (Portugal)

Mr. Leopold Djogbede, professor at the University of Abomey-Calavi and at the Higher Institute Specialist Teacher Training (Benin)

Fr. Bruno Esposito, O.P., ordinary professor of canon law at the Pontifical University of St. Thomas Aquinas, (Italy)

Dr. John Grabowski, Spain, professor of moral theology at the School of Theology and Religious Studies, Catholic University of America, (United States of America)

Fr. Jose Granados, D.C.J.M., deputy director of the Pontifical John Paul II Institute for Studies on Marriage and Family

Fr. Maurizio Gronchi, ordinary professor of dogmatic at the Pontifical Urban University in Rome, (Italy)

Dr. John Kleinsman, director of the Nathaniel Centre for Bioethics, New Zealand Catholic Bishops' Conference, (New Zealand)

Fr. Sabatino Majorano, C.SS.R., professor of systematic moral theology at the Alphonsian Academy in Rome, (Italy)

Msgr. Michele Giulio Masciarelli, lecturer in dogmatic theology at the Marianum Faculty in Rome, and in fundamental theology at the Theological Institute of Abruzzo and Molise in Chieti, Italy

Professor Pia Matthews, lecturer at St. Mary's University College, London, (Great Britain)

Professor Paolo Moneta, former lecturer in canon and ecclesiastical law at the Faculty of Law of the University of Pisa, Italy

Fr. Antonio Moser, O.F.M., professor emeritus of moral and ethical theology at the Franciscan Theological Institute of Petropolis, (Brazil)

Fr. Aimable Musoni, S.D.B., lecturer in systematic theology, ecclesiology and ecumenism at the Pontifical Salesian University in Rome, (Rwanda)

Fr. Georges Henri Ruyssen, S.J., lecturer in the Faculty of Canon Law at the Pontifical Oriental Institute in Rome, (Belgium)

Fr. Peter Paul Saldanha, lecturer in ecclesiology at the Pontifical Urban University in Rome, India

Fr. Pierangelo Sequeri, director and lecturer in theology at the Theological Faculty of Northern Italy, member of the International Theological Commission, (Italy)

Mr. and Mrs Miano, (Italy):

Professor Giuseppina De Simone in Miano, lecturer in philosophy at the Theological Faculty of Southern Italy in Naples

Professor Francesco Miano, lecturer in moral philosophy at the University of Rome.

Auditors

Mr. Jacob Mundaplakal Abraham, advisor for the Apostolate of the Family and Lay Organisations in the dioceses of Kerala, India

Dr. Anca Maria Cernea, physician at the Victor Babes Centre for Diagnosis and Treatment and president of the Association of Catholic Doctors of Bucharest, Romania

Ms. Sharron Cole, president of the Parents Centres New Zealand, New Zealand

Ms. Agnes Offiong Erogunaye, national president of the Catholic Women's Organisation of Nigeria, Nigeria

Fr. Garas Boulos Garas Bishay, pastor of the Virgin Mary Queen of Peace parish, Sharm el Sheikh, Egypt

Professor Giovanni Giacobbe, member of the Union of Italian Catholic Jurists, Italy

Ms. Maria Gomes, head of parish family pastoral ministry in Dubai, United Arab Emirates

Ms. Maria Harries, national director for family pastoral care and preparation for marriage; member of the National Commission for Abuse of Minors, Australia

S. Maureen Kelleher, religious of the Sacred Heart of Mary, member of the International Union of Superiors General (U.I.S.G.), United States of America

Mr. Brenda Kim Nayoug, pastoral worker for young people and young married couples, Korea

Professor Maria Marcela Mazzini, lecturer in theology at the Faculty of Theology of the Pontifical Catholic University of Argentina, Argentina

Ms. Moira McQueen, director of the Canadian Catholic Institute of Bioethics, Canada

Ms. Therese Nyirabukeye, advisor and formator for the African Federation of Family Action (FAAF), Rwanda

S. Berta Maria Porras Fallas, head of Family Pastoral Care of the Tertiary Capuchin Sisters of the Holy Family, Member of the International Union of Superiors General (U.I.S.G.), Costa Rica

S. Carmen Sammut, S.M.N.D.A., president of the International Union of Superiors General (U.I.S.G.), Malta

Professor Lucia Scaraffia, former lecturer in contemporary history at the University of Rome La Sapienza; coordinator of the monthly of the L'Osservatore Romano "Donne Chiesa Mondo", Italy

Dr. Edgar Humberto Tejada Zeballos, physician and specialist in bioethics; member of the Episcopal Commission for the Family of the Peruvian Episcopal Conference, Peru.

Mr. and Mrs. Bajaj, India

Mrs. Penny and Mr. Ishwar Bajaj, Hindu-Christian couple from the diocese of Mumbai, India

Mr. and Mrs. Buch, Germany

Sig.ra Petra Buch, diocesan family pastoral worker

Dr. Aloys Johann Buch, professor of moral theology at the Interdiocesan Major Seminary of St. Lambert; permanent deacon of the diocese of Aachen

Mr. and Mrs. Diaz Victoria, Colombia

Mrs. Isabel Botia de Diaz and Mr. Humberto Diaz Victoria, members of the National Commission for the Family of the Episcopal Conference; pastoral directors of the Hombres y Mujeres de futuro Foundation

Mr. and Mrs. Galindo, Mexico

Mrs. Gertrudiz Clara Rubio De Galindo and Mr. Andres Salvador Galindo Lopez, executive secretaries of the Episcopal Commission for the Family of the Episcopal Conference; secretaries of CELAM for the Mexico-Central America zone

Mr. and Mrs. Gay Montalvo, Spain

Mrs. María Monserrat Rosell Torrus De Gay Montalvo, member of the marriage group of the parish of St. Francis de Sales in Barcelona

Mr. Eugenio Gay Montalvo, former Magistrate of the Constitutional Court of Spain; former member of the diocesan Pastoral Council of Barcelona

Mr. and Mrs. Kola, Cameroon

Mrs. Aicha Marianne Kenne Sob Kola and Mr. Irenee KOLA, members of the African Federation of Family Action (FAAF); marriage and family counsellors

Mr. and Mrs. Marqus Odeesho, Iraq

Mrs. Suhaila Salim Toma and Mr. Wisam Marqus Odeesho, pastoral workers in the Chaldean parish of St. George in Baghdad

Mr. and Mrs. Matassoni, Italy

Mrs. Marialucia Zecchini and Mr. Marco Marassoni, members of the Commission for family pastoral care in the archdiocese of Trento

Mr. and Mrs. Mignonat, France

Mrs. Nathalie Mignonat and Mr. Christian Mignonat, members of the movement Equipes Reliance for remarried divorcees, founder members of the group SEDIRE for receiving and accompanying civilly married couples

Mr. and Mrs. Nkosi, South Africa

Mrs. Buysile Patronella Nkosi and Mr. Meshack Jabulani Nkosi, members of the Advisory Committee for the National Family Desk of the Southern African Episcopal Catholic Bishops' Conference.

Mr. and Mrs. Paloni, Italy

Mrs. Patrizia Calabrese and Mr. Massimo Paloni, couple involved in family missionary pastoral work

Mr. and Mrs. Pulikowski, Poland

Mrs. Jadwiga Pulikowska and Mr. Jacek Pulikowski, advisors of the Council for Family Pastoral Care of the archdiocese of Poznan

Mr. and Mrs. De Rezende, Brazil

Mrs. Ketty Abaroa De Rezende and Dr. Pedro Jussieu De Rezende, lecturers at the Universidade Estadual de Campinas, engaged in family pastoral work

Mr. and Mrs. Rojas, Colombia

Mrs. Maria Angelica Rojas, engaged in family pastoral work, and Mr. Luis Haydn Rojas Martinez, director of the department of Ethics and Humanity at the La gran Colombia University

Mr. and Mrs. Salloum, Lebanon

Mrs. Souheila Rizk Salloum, lecturer in psychology at the USEK.

Mr. Georges Fayez Salloum, expert on the Maronite Patriarchal Synod

Mr. and Mrs. Villafania, Philippines

Mrs. María Socorro Ocampo Villafania, former lecturer in theology at the Assumption College; collaborator with the Salesian Sisters in the preparation of catechists

Mr. Nelson Silvestre Villafania, collaborator with the Evangelion Foundation in Manila

Mr. and Mrs. Witczak, United States of America

Mrs. Catherine Wally Witczak and Mr. Anthony Paul Witczak, directors of Worldwide Marriage Encounter International Ecclesial Team.

General Secretariat of the Synod of Bishops

Cardinal Lorenzo Baldisseri, general secretary of the Synod of Bishops

Bishop Fabio Fabene

Msgr. John Anthony Abruzzese

Msgr. Etienne Brocard

Msgr. Daniel Estivill

Fr. Ambrogio Ivan Samus

Fr. Raffaele Lanzilli, S.J.

Fr. Pasquale Bua

Ms. Paola Volterra Toppano

Dr. Federica Vivian

Mr. Pietro Camilli

Mr. Andrea Cimino

Collaborators of the General Secretariat

Msgr. Zvonimir Sersic of the diocesis of Krk, Croatia

Fr. Giuseppe Deodato of the diocesis of Rome, Italy

Assistants

Fr. Edouard Akom, Cameroon

Sem. Francesco Argese, Italy

Fr. Emmanuel Ayo, Philippines

Fr. Alexis Bavugamenshi, Burundi

Fr. Diac. Jean-Baptiste Bienvenu, France

Fr. Zvonko Brezovski, Croatia

Fr. Diac. Vincent Chretienne, France

Fr. Emmanuel De Ruyver, Belgium

Fr. Gabriele Di Martino, Italy

Fr. William Donovan, United States of America

Fr. Kim D'Souza, Canada

Fr. Georges Eko, Cameroon

Fr. Edgar Estrada, Mexico

Fr. Jonathan Flemings, L.C., United States of America

Fr. Cesar Garcia Salazar, Mexico

Fr. Javier Gaxiola Loustaunau, L.C., Mexico

Fr. Tiago Gurgel Do Vale, Brazil

Fr. Juan Iniesta Saez, Spain

Fr. Miroslaw Juchno, Poland

Fr. Thomas Kallikat, India

Fr. P. Laurent Mazas, F.S.J., France

Fr. Boniface Mungai, Kenya

Fr. Brian Needles, United States of America

Fr. Stephen Prisk, United States of America

Fr. Luis Ramirez Almanra, L.C., Mexico

Fr. Carlos Rodriguez Blanco, Spain

Fr. Roberto Secchi, Italy

Sem. Mattia Seu, Italy

Fr. Jhonny Tannoury, Lebanon

Sem. Liviu-Nicolae Ursu, Romania

Sem. Gabriele Vecchione, Italy

Fr. Biasgiu Virgitti, France.

Heads of news communication

Fr. Federico Lombardi, S.J., director of the Holy See Press Office, Vatican City

Fr. Ciro Benedettini, C.P., deputy director of the Holy See Press Office, Vatican City

English

Fr. Thomas Rosica, C.S.B., Chief Executive Officer of the Salt and Light Catholic Media Foundation, Canada

French

Ms. Romilda Ferrauto, director of the French Section of Vatican Radio

German

Fr. Bernard Hagenkord, S.J., director of the German Section of Vatican Radio

Spanish

Fr. Manuel Dorantes, parish priest, archdiocese of Chicago, United States of America.

Fraternal delegates

Ecumenical Patriarchate

Stephanos, Primate of the Orthodox Church of Estonia, Estonia

Patriarchate of Moscow

Hilarion, Metropolitan of Volokolamsk, president of the Department for External Relations of the Patriarchate of Moscow, Russian Federation

Serbian Patriarchate

Andrej, Bishop of Austria and Switzerland, Austria

Orthodox Church of Romania

Iosif, Metropolitan of Western Europe, France

Orthodox Church of Albania

Bishop Andon of Kruja, Albania

Coptic Orthodox Church of Alexandria

Pishoy, Metropolitan of Damietta, Kafr Elsheikh and Elbarari, Egypt

Syriac-Orthodox Patriarchate of Antioch and All the East

Mar Youstinos Boulos, archbishop of Zahle and Bekaa, Lebanon

Anglican Communion
Tim Thornton, Bishop of Truro (Church of England)

World Lutheran Federation

Ndanganeni Petrus Phaswana, bishop emeritus of the Evangelical Church in South Africa, South Africa

World Methodist Council

Rev. Dr. Tim MacQuiban, director of the ecumenical office of the Methodist Church in Rome, Italy

Christian Church (Disciples of Christ)

Rev. Dr. Robert K. Welsh, president of the Council of the Christian Church (Disciples of Christ), United States of America

Baptist World Alliance

Rev. Dr. A. Roy Medley, general secretary of the Baptist Churches in the United States of America, United States of America

World Council of Churches

Rev. Dr. Walter Altmann, Brazil

World Evangelical Alliance

The Very Reverend Thomas Schirrmacher, president of the Theological Commission of the World Evangelical Alliance, Germany.

References

Synod of bishops in the Catholic Church
Lists of Roman Catholic bishops and archbishops
2015 in Vatican City